Studen may refer to:

Foods 
 Aspic, a gelatinous meat dish known in Eastern Europe as Studen.

Places 
 Studen, Bern, a municipality in the canton of Bern, Switzerland
 Studen, Schwyz, a village in the municipality of Unteriberg, Schwyz, Switzerland
 Studen Kladenets, a reservoir in Bulgaria
 Studen Kladenets (village),
 a village in Bulgaria

People 
 Nenad Studen, a Bosnian Serb professional footballer